Trapania tartanella is a species of sea slug, a dorid nudibranch, a marine gastropod mollusc in the family Goniodorididae.

Distribution
This species was first described from the Mediterranean. It is found on the Atlantic coast from Portugal to Pembrokeshire in South Wales.

Description
This goniodorid nudibranch is translucent white in colour, with yellow-orange markings. The rhinophores, gills and processes are tipped with yellow pigment which becomes orange at the extremities. It is very similar in colour to Trapania hispalensis except that in that species the yellow markings are uniform in colour.

Ecology
Trapania tartanella feeds on Entoprocta which often grow on sponges.

References

Goniodorididae
Taxa named by Hermann von Ihering
Gastropods described in 1886